Anywhere is the second album from New Musik released on 6 March 1981. The cassette edition of the album contained two extra songs not present on the vinyl copies. A digitally remastered version called Anywhere... Plus was released in 2001. Two singles were released in the United Kingdom, "Luxury" on 30 January 1981 and "While You Wait" on 3 April 1981.

"Areas" has been covered by alternative rock band The Gathering on their 2013 album Afterwords.

Track listing 
All songs written and composed by Tony Mansfield unless noted.

GTO Records LP: GTLP 044 

Various 1981 cassette releases of the album includes the bonus tracks "Under Attack" (4:04) after "While You Wait," and "And" (4:38) after "Back to Room One."  These songs only ever appeared again on a reference CD-R made at Abbey Road in 1997, titled Songs of New Musik, as part of a 27-minute track containing various album and single songs from that era.

1994 - GTO Records CD: GTO 474615-2 and 2001 - Edsel Records CD: EDCD 679 (Anywhere... Plus) CD bonus tracks

13 is the B-side of the "Luxury" 7" single.
14 and 15 are the B-sides of the "While You Wait" 12" single.
The 2001 Japanese CD release (Epic Records International--EICP 7016) and 2022 UK LP+12" release (Music on Vinyl/Sony Music--MOVLP2867) include "While You Wait (12 Inch Version)" (5:58) as an extra bonus track, after "The Office."

Personnel 
 Tony Mansfield – guitar, vocals, keyboards
 Clive Gates – keyboards
 Tony Hibbert – bass
 Phil Towner – drums, percussion

Production
 Andrew Douglas: Photography, Sleeve Design
 Peter Hammond: Engineer
 Alan Robinson: Liner Notes

References

New Musik albums
1981 albums
GTO Records albums